Gunabati Union is a union, situated at Chauddagram, Cumilla. It lies along the bank of the Dakatiya River. It covered an area of 20.40 km2, and had a population of 36,789.

History
Gunabati is named after the name of "Gunbati", wife of Maharaja Govinda Manik of Tripura.

Language and culture

Language
Due to the geographical position, Gunabati is situated in the south-eastern region of Bangladesh. It is bounded by Tripura State of India, the upazilas of Dhaka Division And Chittagong Division. The language of the people of Gunabati Union is mostly influenced by Tripura State of India, the upazilas of Dhaka Division And Chittagong Division. The main features of the language are similar to the other upazilas of Bangladesh. Yet some diversity is found. In the spoken language, the sound of "mahapran dhonni" is absent. This means that there is a trend of simplification of language. The language of Gunabati Union is very similar to the language of Dhaka region, regional languages of Laksham Upazila and the language of Noakhali.

Culture
The culture of Gunabati union is the holder and carrier of the ancient Bangladesh. The Bangla New Year is still celebrated there. Boishakhi fair is organized in different places on the occasion of Bangla New Year. Apart from this, the Nabanna festival, welcome to monsoon, and various social and domestic festivals in winter are celebrated by the people of Gunabati union. The ancient games of Bengal Ha-Doo-Doo, Gollachut, Kanamachi Bhoo-Bhoo are still played by many of the villagers.

Administration

Structure

Gunabati Union is a union parishad of Chauddagram upazilla. Administrative activities of this union are under Chauddagram police station. It is a part of Comilla-11 constituency No. 259 of the Jatiya Sangsad. It is divided into 32 mouzas. The union has 9 wards and 28 villages. The villages of this union are:

Ward 1

Rampur, Bishnupur, Shubornopur, Gajariya

Ward 2

Surikara, Jhikodda, Akhirtola, Moyurpur

Ward 3

Porikot, Fuler Nawri, Boro Khaiyajola

Ward 4

Godanogor, Rajbollobpur

Ward 5

Chapachow, Kortam, Gunabati Bazar

Ward 6

Dashbaha, Narayanpur, North Pirijkora

Ward 7

South Sripur, South Pirijkora, Akdiya

Ward 8

Chapaliya Para, Budhora, Koitora

Ward 9

Gunabati, Khatora, Bagertham

Education

College
 Gunabati Degree College

High schools

Primary schools

Madrasa

Economics

Banks
 Janata Bank
 Islami Bank Bangladesh Ltd [Agent Banking]
 Dhaka Bank Limited
 Southeast Bank Limited
 Pubali Bank
 Shahjalal Islami Bank Limited
 NRB Global Bank
 Dutch Bangla Bank [Agent Banking]
 NRBC Bank

NGOs

Transport

There is a railway station (name: Gunabati Railway Station), a CNG station and a seasonal boat terminal.

Railway services
Intercity services
 Mohanagar Godhuli @4:47 PM toward Dhaka
 Mohanagar Provati @12:09 PM toward chitagong 

Local services
 Demu
 Jalalabad
 Karnafuli
 Nasirabad
 Sagorika

Healthcare

Hospitals

 Gunabati Diagnostics Hospital
 Oli Ahmed Diagnostic Center

Clinics
 Gunabati Health Clinic

References

External links

Unions of Chauddagram Upazila
Cumilla District